Saddam Abdel-Muhsan Sobhi Jarrar is a Jordanian retired footballer of Palestinian origin who plays for Al-Jazeera (Jordan).

References

External links 
 
 

1991 births
Living people
Jordanian footballers
Jordan international footballers
Jordanian people of Palestinian descent
Jordanian expatriate footballers
Expatriate footballers in the State of Palestine
Jordanian expatriate sportspeople in the State of Palestine
Association football forwards
Al-Wehdat SC players
Al-Jazeera (Jordan) players
Markaz Shabab Al-Am'ari players
Sportspeople from Amman
Jordanian Pro League players
West Bank Premier League players
Expatriate sportspeople in the State of Palestine